The , colloquially known as Bidai or Kanabi, is a public university in Kanazawa, Ishikawa, Japan.

About 
Kanazawa College of Art was founded in 1946 by the Kanazawa municipal government following World War II, and became a full-fledged university in 1955. The graduate program was established in 1979. 

Currently, on an annual basis the school enrolls 145 undergraduates, 32 for the master's program, and seven in the doctoral program. It is the smallest art university in Japan with regards to the number of students, only having about 600-700 students at any given time. The university is known for a peculiar tradition in which some students wear costumes to the graduation ceremony.

The university was originally located in the Dewa district of Kanazawa, and moved to its current location in 1972. In 2016 the university announced plans to relocate to a new campus in the near future, citing a lack of space, outdated and inadequate facilities, and no universally-accessible installations (such as slopes and wheelchair-friendly restrooms) in the nearly-50-year-old buildings among their concerns. The plans were formally approved in 2018; the new campus is scheduled to be completed in 2022 and to open in 2023.

Notable alumni
 Kazuyoshi Hayagawa - television commercial director
 Akiko Higashimura - manga author
 Mamoru Hosoda - animation director
 Hitomi Hosono - ceramicist
 Naohisa Inoue - painter
 Shinya Kumazaki - video game director for HAL Laboratories
 Shigeru Miyamoto - video game producer for Nintendo
 Hiromasa Yonebayashi - animation director for Studio Ghibli
 Kinuko Y. Craft (Kinuko Yamabe) - painter and illustrator

External links
 Official homepage
 English homepage

References 

Art schools in Japan
Educational institutions established in 1946
Kanazawa College of Art
1946 establishments in Japan
Kanazawa
Public universities in Japan